Paris Township is one of the fourteen townships of Union County, Ohio, United States.  The 2010 census found 23,645 people in the township.

Geography
Located in the center of the county, it borders the following townships:
Taylor Township - north
Leesburg Township - northeast
Dover Township - east
Millcreek Township - southeast
Darby Township - south
Union Township - southwest
Allen Township - west
Liberty Township - northwest

The majority of the city of Marysville, the county seat of Union County, is located in Paris Township.

Name and history
Paris Township was established in 1821. Statewide, other Paris Townships are located in Portage and Stark counties.

Government
The township is governed by a three-member board of trustees, who are elected in November of odd-numbered years to a four-year term beginning on the following January 1. Two are elected in the year after the presidential election and one is elected in the year before it. There is also an elected township fiscal officer, who serves a four-year term beginning on April 1 of the year after the election, which is held in November of the year before the presidential election. Vacancies in the fiscal officership or on the board of trustees are filled by the remaining trustees.

References

External links
Union County website

Townships in Union County, Ohio
Townships in Ohio